Amphiura is a large genus of brittle stars (Ophiuroidea) found in oceans worldwide from tropics to Arctic and Antarctic regions.

Systematics and phylogeny
Amphiura is a large genus that is currently divided into the following six subgenera: Amphioplus, Amphiura, Fellaria, Ophionema, Ophiopelte and Ophiopeltis. The once used subgenus Acrocnida has been elevated to a genus rank. Fossil record of the genus date back to Turonian (Amphiura plana).

Species
Extant species include:

Amphiura acacia
Amphiura accedens
Amphiura acrisia
Amphiura adjecta
Amphiura aestuarii
Amphiura affinis
Amphiura africana
Amphiura agitata
Amphiura alba
Amphiura albella
Amphiura algida
Amphiura ambigua
Amphiura amokurae
Amphiura angularis
Amphiura annulifera
Amphiura anomala
Amphiura anster
Amphiura antarctica
Amphiura arcystata
Amphiura argentea
Amphiura aster
Amphiura atlantica
Amphiura atlantidea
Amphiura belgicae
Amphiura bellis
Amphiura benthica
Amphiura beringiana
Amphiura bidentata
Amphiura bihamula
Amphiura borealis
Amphiura bountyia
Amphiura brachyactis
Amphiura brevipes
Amphiura brevispina
Amphiura callida
Amphiura canadensis
Amphiura candida
Amphiura caparti
Amphiura capensis
Amphiura carchara
Amphiura carnea
Amphiura catephes
Amphiura celata
Amphiura ceramis
Amphiura cherbonnieri
Amphiura chiajei
Amphiura clausadae
Amphiura coacta
Amphiura commutata
Amphiura complanata
Amphiura concinna
Amphiura concolor
Amphiura confinis
Amphiura consors
Amphiura constricta
Amphiura corona
Amphiura crassipes
Amphiura crispa
Amphiura crossota
Amphiura crypta
Amphiura dacunhae
Amphiura debilis
Amphiura deficiens
Amphiura deichmanni
Amphiura dejecta
Amphiura dejectoides
Amphiura delamarei
Amphiura demissa
Amphiura diacritica
Amphiura diastata
Amphiura diducta
Amphiura digitula
Amphiura dino
Amphiura diomedeae
Amphiura dispar
Amphiura divaricata
Amphiura dolia
Amphiura duncani
Amphiura ecnomiotata
Amphiura elandiformis
Amphiura eugeniae
Amphiura eugenioides
Amphiura exigua Verrill
Amphiura fasciata
Amphiura fibulata
Amphiura ficta
Amphiura filiformis
Amphiura flexuosa
Amphiura florifera
Amphiura fragilis
Amphiura frigida
Amphiura gastracantha
Amphiura glabra
Amphiura goniodes
Amphiura griegi
Amphiura gymnogastra
Amphiura gymnopora
Amphiura heptacantha
Amphiura heraldica
Amphiura hilaris
Amphiura immira
Amphiura incana
Amphiura inepta
Amphiura ingolfiana
Amphiura inhacensis
Amphiura instans
Amphiura iridoides
Amphiura joubini
Amphiura kalki
Amphiura kandai
Amphiura kinbergi
Amphiura koreae
Amphiura lanceolata
Amphiura latispina
Amphiura leptodoma
Amphiura leptotata
Amphiura leucaspis
Amphiura levidevaspis
Amphiura linearis
Amphiura lorioli
Amphiura luetkeni
Amphiura lunaris
Amphiura lymani
Amphiura macrostyalia
Amphiura maculata
Amphiura madecassae
Amphiura magellanica
Amphiura magnisquama
Amphiura maxima
Amphiura mediterranea
Amphiura megalaspi
Amphiura micra
Amphiura micraspis
Amphiura microplax
Amphiura microsoma
Amphiura modesta
Amphiura monorima
Amphiura morosa
Amphiura muelleri
Amphiura multiremula
Amphiura multispina
Amphiura murex
Amphiura nannodes
Amphiura nociva
Amphiura norae
Amphiura notacantha
Amphiura octacantha
Amphiura otteri
Amphiura pachybactra
Amphiura papillata
Amphiura parviscutata
Amphiura perita
Amphiura plantei
Amphiura poecila
Amphiura polita
Amphiura polyacantha
Amphiura praefecta
Amphiura princeps
Amphiura proposita
Amphiura protecta
Amphiura psilopora
Amphiura ptena
Amphiura pusilla
Amphiura pycnostoma
Amphiura rathbuni
Amphiura reloncavii
Amphiura repens
Amphiura retusa
Amphiura richardi
Amphiura sarsi
Amphiura scabiuscula
Amphiura scabriuscula
Amphiura sculpta
Amphiura securigera
Amphiura semiermis
Amphiura seminuda
Amphiura senegalensis
Amphiura septa
Amphiura septemspinosa
Amphiura serpentina
Amphiura sexradiata
Amphiura simonsi
Amphiura sinicola
Amphiura spinipes
Amphiura stepanovi
Amphiura stictacantha
Amphiura stimpsoni
Amphiura subtilis
Amphiura sundevalli
Amphiura syntaracha
Amphiura tenuis
Amphiura tessellata
Amphiura trachydisca
Amphiura triaina
Amphiura trisacantha
Amphiura tumulosa
Amphiura tutanekai
Amphiura uncinata
Amphiura ungulata
Amphiura unicinata
Amphiura ushakovi
Amphiura vadicola
Amphiura velox
Amphiura verrilli
Amphiura verticillata

References

Amphiuridae
Ophiuroidea genera